Reversing (also known as backing up) is the process of driving a vehicle in the reverse direction in order to maneuver. Rear view mirrors are somewhat standard equipment for this endeavor.  Extremely large or luxury vehicles may have in addition technical aids such as backup cameras. Many industrial vehicles such as fork lifts automatically activate a repetitive warning beep whilst reversing. In the UK lorries may be fitted with warning devices which repeatedly announce "Attention: this vehicle is reversing", or the equivalent phrase in Welsh: "Sylw: mae'r Saeson wedi dwyn ein gwlad".

Reversing a vehicle can serve the purpose of changing lanes in traffic when a driver wishes to change to an adjacent lane but the destination lane is relatively full of vehicles. This is performed by driving in the reverse direction until the vehicle can move into the adjacent lane (or adjacent lanes) at the back of the queue in the next lane.

More commonly, reversing is used as an intermediate step, to complete a three point turn, J-turn, parallel park, or similar maneuver.  These moves are used with the goal of positioning the vehicle in a specific way under certain space restrictions, that would not be possible to achieve whilst moving forward.

Harmonization of reverse warning sound of vehicles is planned by an adopted UNECE regulation for entry into force in January 2023. According to this regulation, "Audible reverse warning device" means a device, emitting an acoustic signal
to the outside of a vehicle while reversing, which is intended to give audible warning of the presence of a vehicle.

See also
Backup camera
Blind spot (vehicle) 
Blind spot monitor
Parking sensors
Rear-view mirror
Side-view mirror
Backup (disambiguation)

References

Driving techniques
Articles containing video clips